RealFlight RC Simulator is a radio-controlled airplane and helicopter simulation software series developed by Knife Edge Software and now published by Horizon Hobby. The software allows for the flying of numerous RC aircraft, helicopters and drones so that the user can learn to fly RC, practice their skills or fly with others in multiplayer mode.

Note: Although RealFlight RC Simulator has a similar name to Real Flight Simulator it has nothing to do with it. Real Flight Simulator (goes around with a few different names) is a commercial rebranding of an old version of the free and opensource flight simulator Flightgear. 

Included with RealFlight RC Simulator are various flying sites (or airports) and aircraft models, almost all of which represent real-life models. The software also includes an airport editor and an aircraft editor to allow for the creation of new flying sites and aircraft. Within RealFlight, editing aircraft is limited to changing the physical and aerodynamic properties. In order to create new visual models, the use of a 3D modeling application such as Autodesk 3ds Max or Blender is required.

The software is released in "generations," with each new generation including major updates and new features. The most recent is RealFlight 9, which included additions such as water and water physics, an improved user interface, more aircraft, more flying sites, and an improved "InterLink Elite" controller. RealFlight requires the connection of an InterLink controller, which is included with the software, in order to operate.

Add-Ons and Expansion Packs
Knife Edge Software also develops packs containing additional content for RealFlight, each of which adds new airfields and additional aircraft. For users of RealFlight G4 or newer, the older series of "Add-On" packs have been reworked, with several aircraft receiving updates, and can be downloaded freely from the RealFlight website.

The "Add-Ons" volumes, which are no longer officially supported, have been superseded by the newer "Expansion Pack" series of products. The Add-Ons line is compatible with versions of RealFlight dating back to RealFlight Classic, with the exception of Add-Ons 5, which requires RealFlight G2 or higher. Expansion Pack 1 through Expansion Pack 4 require RealFlight G3 or higher, and Expansion Pack 5 and up require RealFlight G4 or higher. Expansion Packs 1 through 3 are now discontinued products.

Compatibility Chart

External links
 RealFlight Home Page
 Knife Edge Software Home Page

References

1998 video games
Flight simulation video games
Radio-controlled aircraft
Video games developed in the United States
Windows games
Windows-only games